Paolini is an Italian surname. Notable people with the surname include:

Brinson Paolini (born 1991), American professional golfer
Christopher Paolini (born 1983), American fantasy and science-fiction writer
Diego Paolini, Italian slalom canoer
Enrico Paolini (born 1945), Italian racing cyclist
Gabriele Paolini (born 1974), Italian television prankster and condom advocate
Giulio Paolini (born 1940), Italian sculptor
Jasmine Paolini (born 1996), Italian tennis player
Lauren Paolini (born 1987), American female volleyball player
Luca Paolini (born 1977), Italian professional road bicycle racer
Marco Paolini (born 1956), Italian stage actor, theatre director, dramaturge and author
Marco Paolini (footballer) ((born 1995), Italian footballer
Pietro Paolini (1603–1681), Italian painter of the Baroque era
Pio Fabio Paolini or Pio Paolini (1620–1692), Italian painter of the Baroque period

Italian-language surnames
Patronymic surnames
Surnames from given names